Gretel is an Australian racing yacht in the 12-metre class that unsuccessfully challenged for the 1962 America's Cup.

Gretel lost to Weatherly by 1–4.

References

12-metre class yachts
America's Cup challengers
1960s sailing yachts
Sailing yachts built in Australia
1962 America's Cup